The Izz ad-Din al-Qassam Brigades (also spelt Izzedine or Ezzedeen Al-Qassam Brigades; often shortened to Al-Qassam Brigades, IQB or EQB), named after Izz ad-Din al-Qassam, is the military wing of the Palestinian organization Hamas. Currently led by Mohammed Deif and his deputy, Marwan Issa, IQB is the largest and best-equipped group operating within Gaza today.

Created in mid-1991, it was at the time concerned with blocking the Oslo Accords negotiations. From 1994 to 2000, the Al-Qassam Brigades has claimed responsibility for carrying out a number of attacks against Israelis.

At the beginning of the Second Intifada, the group became a central target of Israel. The group's strength and its ability to carry out complex and lethal attacks surprised many observers. The Al-Qassam Brigades operated several cells in the West Bank, but most of them were destroyed by 2004 following numerous operations of the Israeli Defense Forces (IDF) in the region. In contrast, Hamas retained a forceful presence in the Gaza Strip, generally considered its stronghold. Yahya Sinwar, Hamas political leader in the Gaza Strip since February 2017, is a military leader in the Brigades in Gaza.

The Al-Qassam Brigades are explicitly listed as a terrorist organization by the European Union, Australia, New Zealand, Egypt, and the United Kingdom. Though not explicitly mentioning IQB, the United States and Canada have designated its parent entity, Hamas, as a terrorist organization; Brigade leader Mohammed Deif has also been classified as a Specially Designated Global Terrorist by the US under Executive Order 13224. As the Brigades undertake military activity on behalf of Hamas, "organized terrorist activities associated with Hamas can be reliably attributed to the Brigades."

Overview
The Izz ad-Din al-Qassam Brigades is the military wing of the Palestinian organization Hamas, operating in the Gaza Strip. It is currently led by Mohammed Deif and its deputy, Marwan Issa.
The Al-Qassam Brigades is named after Izz ad-Din al-Qassam, a Muslim preacher and mujahid in Mandatory Palestine. In 1930, al-Qassam organised and established the Black Hand, a militant organisation that was opposed to Zionism and British and French rule in the Levant.

According to the Al-Qassam Brigades, its aims are:

To contribute in the effort of liberating Palestine and restoring the rights of the Palestinian people under the sacred Islamic teachings of the Holy Quran, the Sunnah (traditions) of Prophet Muhammad (peace and blessings of Allah be upon him) and the traditions of Muslims rulers and scholars noted for their piety and dedication.
In summary, the Brigades seek to establish an Islamist state of Palestine, comprising Gaza, the West Bank, and Israel—ending Israel as a political entity in the process.

Organisation and structure

The Izz al-Din al-Qassam Brigades are an integral part of Hamas. While they are subordinate to Hamas's broad political goals and its ideological objectives, they have a significant level of independence in decision making. In 1997, political scientists Ilana Kass and Bard O'Neill described Hamas' relationship with the Brigades as reminiscent of Sinn Féin's relationship to the military arm of the Irish Republican Army and quoted a senior Hamas official: "The Izz al-Din al-Qassam Brigade is a separate armed military wing, which has its own leaders who do not take their orders [from Hamas] and do not tell us of their plans in advance." Carrying the IRA analogy further, Kass and O'Neill stated that the separation of the political and military wings shielded Hamas' political leaders from responsibility for terrorism while the plausible deniability this provided made Hamas an eligible representative for peace negotiations as had happened with Sinn Féin's Gerry Adams.

The fighters' identities and positions in the group often remain secret until their death; even when they fight against Israeli incursions, all the militants wear a characteristic black hood on which the group's green headband is attached. The Brigades operate on a model of independent cells and even high-ranking members are often unaware of the activities of other cells. This allows the group to consistently regenerate after member deaths. During the Al-Aqsa Intifada, the leaders of the group were targeted by numerous airstrikes that killed many members, including Salah Shahade and Adnan al-Ghoul. The current leader of the Brigades, Mohammed Deif, remains at large and is said to have survived at least five assassination attempts.

Notable members 
Mohammed Deif
Marwan Issa
Yahya Ayash
Adnan al-Ghoul
Salah Shahade
Wa'el Nassar
Ahmed Jabari
Salama Hamad
Imad Abbas
Imad Akel
Nidal Fat'hi Rabah Farahat
Abu Obeida, spokesman
Yunis al-Astal
Muhammad Nazami Nasser

History

Background
In 1984, Sheikh Ahmed Yassin, Ibrahim al-Makhadmeh, Sheikh Salah Shehada, and others began preparing for the establishment of an armed organization to resist Israeli control, with a focus on acquiring weapons for future resistance activities. Members of the group were, however, arrested and the weapons were confiscated.

In 1986, Shehada formed a network of resistance cells, called al-Mujahidun al-Filastiniun ('Palestinian fighters'), who targeted Israeli troops and "traitors." This network operated until 1989, with their most famous operation being the kidnapping and killing of two Israeli soldiers: Avi Sasportas and Ilan Saadon.

Hamas was officially established soon after, on 14 December 1987, forming other similar networks as al-Mujahidun al-Filastiniun, such as the Abdullah Azzam Brigades. In mid-1991, in during the First Palestinian Intifada (1987-1994), the Izz ad-Din al-Qassam Brigades was established to provide Hamas with a paramilitary capability, thereafter becoming known as the armed branch of Hamas.

Contemporary operations and activities
The international community, and more specifically the United Nations, considers the practice of war combatants to turn civilians into human shields as a violation of the Geneva Conventions standards of war, and considers indiscriminate attacks (e.g., by rockets or suicide bombers) on civilian populations as illegal under international law.

The IQB's transition into a recognised militant organisation began during the establishment of the Oslo Accords to assist Hamas efforts in blocking them. In 2003 and 2004, the Brigades in Gaza resisted incursions by the Israel Defense Forces (IDF), including the siege of Jabalya in October 2004. However, these battles took a heavy toll in the IQB's ranks, which suffered heavy losses. The group, however, continued to gain strength and remained capable of carrying out attacks in the following years. The Brigades can count on a large pool of people willing to join them , smuggle in supplies and provide the fighters with homemade weapons such as the al-Bana, the Batar, the Yasin and the Qassam rocket.

In early 2005, the Al-Qassam Brigades appeared to stand by a truce negotiated between the government of Israel and the Palestinian Authority. However the Brigades took advantage of the truce to regroup. Following Israel's withdrawal from the Gaza Strip in August 2005, the Al-Qassam Brigades staged several rallies in which they displayed thousands of fighters and an assortment of weaponry in Gaza. These celebrations ended abruptly when, on 23 September, twenty Palestinians were killed as a car carrying Qassam rockets exploded among a dense crowd. Since this incident, the brigades refrained from staging public displays of force as well as launching attacks at Israel, which, in turn, refrained from targeting Hamas members in assassinations and raids. Despite occasional and brief flare-ups of violence, the brigades generally respected this truce until the beginning of June 2006. The Palestinian Authority has been, during this period, under intense pressure from Israel and the Middle East Quartet to disarm Hamas, but fears of heavy resistance from the Al-Qassam Brigades and a possible civil war, coupled with a victory of the movement in the 2006 legislative elections, prevented any such attempts. As a result, it is widely believed that the brigades stockpiled thousands of homemade weapons and projectiles during 2005 and 2006 and were actively attempting to rebuild their destroyed cells in the West Bank.

Also in 2005, President Mahmoud Abbas had taken direct control of the PA security forces which was loyal to the president's Fatah movement, and the Hamas government formed a separate 3,000-strong paramilitary police force in the Gaza Strip, called Executive Force, which was made up of members of the Al-Qassam Brigades.

In May 2006, a police force was formed in Gaza, consisting of thousands of Brigade fighters. It aimed to restore law and order in the city but instead broke out into clashes with Fatah militias. On 10 June 2006, after the Gaza beach blast in which seven civilians died, the Brigades announced a cessation of the 2005 truce with Israel. In the following hours, they claimed responsibility for launching Qassam rockets at the Israeli town of Sderot, and threatened to step up their attacks.

In June and July 2006, the Al-Qassam Brigades were involved in the operation which led to the capture of Israeli soldier Gilad Shalit, and in the subsequent heavy fighting in the Gaza Strip following Operation Summer Rains, launched by the IDF. It was the first time in over 18 months that the brigades were actively involved in fighting against Israeli soldiers. In May 2007, the brigades acknowledged they lost 192 fighters during the operation.

In January 2007, Abbas outlawed the Executive Force and ordered that its then-6,000 members be incorporated into the PA security forces under his command. The order was resisted by the Hamas government, which instead announced plans to double the size of the force to 12,000 men. The Al-Qassam Brigades and the Executive Force took part in the Hamas takeover of Gaza in June 2007.

In June 2008, Egypt brokered a ceasefire, which lasted until 4 November when Israeli forces crossed into Gaza and killed six Hamas fighters; this resulted in an increase in rocket attacks on Israel, going from two in September and October to 190 in November. Both sides claimed the other had broken the truce. The continuing rocket fire into Israel led to the Gaza War (2008–09) in late December 2008.

Armed strength
Since its establishment in December 1987, the military capability of the Brigades has increased markedly, from rifles to Qassam rockets and more.

The Brigades have a substantial inventory of light automatic weapons and grenades, improvised rockets, mortars, bombs, suicide belts, and explosives. The group engages in military-style training, including training that takes place in Gaza itself on a range of weapons designed to inflict significant casualties on civilian and military targets.

The Brigades also have a variety of anti-tank guided missiles including the Kornet-E, Konkurs-M, Bulsae-2 (North Korean version of Fagot), 9K11 Malyutka and MILAN missiles, as well as shoulder-launched anti-aircraft missiles (MANPADS), such as the SA-7B, SA-18 Igla missiles, and it is believed a number of SA-24 Igla-S that it received from Libya.

While the number of members is known only to the Brigades leadership, in 2011 Israel estimated that the Brigades have a cadre of several hundred members who receive military-style training, including training in Iran and Syria. Additionally, the Brigades have an estimated 30,000 operatives "of varying degrees of skill and professionalism" who are members of the internal security forces, Hamas, and their supporters. These operatives can be expected to reinforce the Brigades in an "emergency situation." Other sources estimate their strength at 30,000-50,000.

According to a statement by CIA director George Tenet in 2000 possibly referring to the Brigades, Hamas has pursued a capability to conduct attacks with toxic chemicals. There have been reports of Hamas operatives planning and preparing attacks incorporating chemicals. In one case, nails and bolts packed into explosives detonated by a Hamas suicide bomber in a December 2001 attack in the Ben-Yehuda street in Jerusalem were soaked in rat poison. In 2014 they launched the first Palestinian reconnaissance (UAV) aircraft called Ababeel1.

List of the Brigades' attacks against Israeli targets

Leaders killed by Israel or other causes
On 5 January 1996, Israel's Shin Bet arranged for a cell phone that was both bugged and contained explosives be given to Yahya Ayyash. When it was confirmed that it was Ayyash on the phone, Shin Bet remotely detonated it, killing Ayyash instantly.

On 3 September 2005, after Israel's withdrawal from settlements in the Gaza Strip, the Al-Qassam Brigrades revealed for the first time the names and functions of its commanders on its website as well as in a printed bulletin distributed to Palestinians. Most of the information published, including pictures of three leaders, was reportedly already known by Israel's intelligence services. According to the bulletin, in 2006 Mohammed Deif was overall commander with Ahmed Ja'abari as second in command. Other sub-commanders controlled Gaza City (Raid Said), the northern Gaza Strip and Jabalya refugee camp (Ahmad al-Ghandur), southern Gaza Strip (Muhammad Abu Shamala), and Khan Younis (Muhammad al-Sanwar).

On 12 July 2006, the Israeli Air Force bombed a house in the Sheikh Radwan neighborhood of Gaza City, where Mohammed Deif, Ahmad al-Ghandur and Raid Said were meeting. The three-story house was completely leveled, killing Hamas official Nabil al-Salmiah, his wife, their five children and two other children. Two of the three brigades leaders present escaped with moderate wounds while Deif received a spinal injury that required four hours of surgery.

On 1 January 2009, Nizar Rayan, a top Hamas leader who served as a liaison between the Palestinian organization's political leadership and its military wing, was killed in an Israeli Air Force strike during Operation Cast Lead. The day before the attack, Rayan had advocated renewal of suicide attacks on Israel, declaring, "Our only language with the Jew is through the gun". A 2,000-pound bomb was dropped on his house, also killing his 4 wives (Hiam 'Abdul Rahman Rayan, 46; Iman Khalil Rayan, 46; Nawal Isma'il Rayan, 40; and Sherine Sa'id Rayan, 25) and 11 of their children (As'ad, 2; Usama Ibn Zaid, 3; 'Aisha, 3; Reem, 4; Miriam, 5; Halima, 5; 'Abdul Rahman, 6; Abdul Qader, 12; Aaya, 12; Zainab, 15; and Ghassan, 16).

On 3 January 2009, Israeli aircraft attacked the car in which Abu Zakaria al-Jamal, a leader of Izz ad-Din al-Qassam armed wing, was traveling. He subsequently died of the wounds suffered in the bombing. The following day, the Israeli Air Force struck and killed in Khan Yunis two senior Brigrade leaders, Hussam Hamdan and Muhammad Hilo, both of whom the Israelis blamed for attacks against Israel. According to Israeli authorities Hamdan was in charge of rocket attacks against Beersheba and Ofakim, while Hilo was reportedly behind Hamas' special forces in Khan Yunis.

On 15 January 2009, the Israeli Air Force bombed a house in Jabaliya, killing a prominent Brigades commander named Mohammed Watfa (the strike targeted the Palestinian Interior Minister Said Seyam, who was also killed).

On 30 July 2010, one of the leaders Issa Abdul-Hadi Al-Batran, aged 40, was killed at the Nuseirat refugee camp in the central Gaza Strip by an Israeli airstrike.

On 14 November 2012, Ahmed Jaabari, the head of the Al-Qassam Brigade, was killed along with seven others in Gaza marking the beginning of Israel's "Operation Pillar of Defense".

On 21 August 2014, an Israeli air strike killed Muhammad Abu Shamala, the sub-commander of Southern Gaza Strip; Raed al Atar, the commander of the Rafah company and member of the Hamas high military council; and Mohammed Barhoum.

On 30 January 2018, Imad Al-Alami died as a result of injuries sustained while he was inspecting his personal weapon in Gaza City.

International response 
The international community, and more specifically the United Nations, considers the practice of war combatants to turn civilians into human shields as a violation of the Geneva Conventions standards of war, and considers indiscriminate attacks (e.g., by rockets or suicide bombers) on civilian populations as illegal under international law.

As the Brigades undertake military activity on behalf of Hamas, "organized terrorist activities associated with Hamas can be reliably attributed to the Brigades."

The Al-Qassam Brigades are explicitly listed as a terrorist organization by the European Union, Australia, New Zealand, Egypt, and the United Kingdom. Though not explicitly mentioning IQB, the United States and Canada have designated its parent entity, Hamas, as a terrorist organization; Brigade leader Mohammed Deif has also been classified as a Specially Designated Global Terrorist by the US under Executive Order 13224.

References

Organizations based in Asia designated as terrorist
Hamas
Jihadist groups
Military wings of nationalist parties
Muslim Brotherhood
National liberation movements
Palestinian terrorism
Palestinian militant groups
Resistance movements
Organisations designated as terrorist by the United Kingdom
Organisations designated as terrorist by Australia
Organizations designated as terrorist by the United States
Organizations designated as terrorist by Egypt
Organisations designated as terrorist by the European Union
Organisations designated as terrorist by New Zealand
Axis of Resistance